Palomar 6 is a loose globular cluster in the constellation Ophiuchus that belongs to the Milky Way galaxy. It is a member of the Palomar Globular Clusters group. It is located about 25,000 light-years (7,700 parsecs) away from the Sun. It formed in what would become the bulge of the Milky Way. It is similar to other old-bulge globular clusters such as Messier 62, NGC 6522, NGC 6558, and Haute-Provence 1.

First discovered on the National Geographic Society – Palomar Observatory Sky Survey plates by Robert G. Harrington and Fritz Zwicky,
it was catalogued as a globular cluster, and is one of four globulars known to contain a planetary nebula.

References

External links
 
 Simbad reference data
 SEDS: Palomar 6, Capricornus Dwarf
 
 

Palomar 06
Ophiuchus (constellation)
•
?